The Lady Elizabeth School is a British International school in the Province of Alicante, Spain, located in Benitachell.

History
It opened in 1987 with a Junior School. Its Secondary School opened in the 1990s. The company LAUDE began operating the school in 2007. In 2018, their Secondary School moved to a new location, next to their junior school at the Cumbre del Sol.

Student body
In 2010 there were 620 pupils, 60% British and 35% Spanish.

References

External links
 The Lady Elizabeth School Website (English)

British international schools in Spain
1987 establishments in Spain
Educational institutions established in 1987
Marina Alta
Buildings and structures in the Province of Alicante